Mettapalli is a village panchayat in Cheepurupalli mandal of Vizianagaram district in Andhra Pradesh, India. It is located about 29 km from Vizianagaram city.

Demographics
According to Indian census, 2001, the demographic details of this village is as follows:
 Total Population:  3,369 in 701 Households.
 Male Population:  1,707
 Female Population:  1,662
 Children Under 6-years of age: 410 (Boys - 202 and Girls - 208)
 Total Literates:  1,185

References

Villages in Vizianagaram district